Rutherford Platt Hayes (June 24, 1858 – July 31, 1927) was an American librarian. Hayes was the third son of Rutherford B. Hayes, president of the United States from 1877 to 1881. He attended Michigan State University and Cornell University, where he was a member of Delta Kappa Epsilon, graduating in 1880. He also attended the Boston Institute of Technology. 

Hayes returned to his family's home in Fremont, Ohio in 1882 and went to work for the Fremont Savings Bank. Soon after he returned to Fremont, Hayes became a Trustee of the Birchard Library which was founded by his granduncle, Sardis Birchard. He introduced several progressive ideas to its management, including the introduction of a children's area and sending boxes of books to neighboring towns (similar to today's bookmobiles). He published the library's catalog as installments in a local paper. He was one of the founders of the Ohio Library Association in 1895 and advocated for a bill in the legislature to appoint a state library commission. Hayes was appointed to the Ohio Library Commission in 1896.

Hayes left Ohio for Chicago, Illinois, where he worked on library issues and developed a traveling library. He  moved to Asheville, North Carolina, where he acquired large holdings of land. He worked with Asheville resident Edward W. Pearson, an African-American entrepreneur, to develop new African-American residential neighborhoods in West Asheville. In North Carolina, Hayes engaged in scientific farming on a large scale. Hayes was President of the Appalachian Forest Reserve and the western North Carolina Fair. He moved to Clearwater, Florida, in 1922. In Florida, he served as chairman of the board of directors of the Clearwater Savings and Loan Association and the First Mortgage Investment Company. 

Throughout his life he maintained his interest in library matters, promoting those of Asheville and Clearwater, and retaining his membership on the board of trustees of the library in Fremont, Ohio. He served as secretary of the American Library Association and also served as vice president and acting president from October 1897 through January 1898.

Hayes died on July 31, 1927, in Tampa, Florida, of carcinoma of the prostate gland.

See also
Library science

References

 

American librarians
Presidents of the American Library Association
Cornell University alumni
Michigan State University alumni
1858 births
1927 deaths
People from Cincinnati
People from Fremont, Ohio
Children of presidents of the United States
Hayes family